The black mamba  (Dendroaspis polylepis) is a venomous snake.

Black Mamba may also refer to:

Entertainment
 Black Mamba (character), a fictional supervillain in the Marvel Comics universe
 Black Mamba (film), a 1974 horror film
 Beatrix Kiddo or Black Mamba, a character in Kill Bill
 Black Mamba, a 2008 album by Mani Spinx
 "Black Mamba", a song from the album Almost Here by The Academy Is...
 "Black Mamba", the debut single of aespa
 The Black Mamba (Portuguese band), a Portuguese band
 The Black Mamba (film), a 2011 short film

Military
 Black Mamba Anti-Poaching Unit, a South African ranger unit founded in 2013
 Black Mamba (group), an anti-terrorism group in Uganda

People with the nickname 
 Kobe Bryant (1978–2020), American basketball player
 Kultar Gill (born 1979), Indian-Canadian mixed martial artist
 Roger Mayweather (1961–2020), American boxer
 Sandra Naujoks (born 1981), German professional poker player
 De'Anthony Thomas (born 1993), American football player
 John Butler Walden (1939–2002), Tanzanian military officer

Other uses
 Black Mamba (roller coaster), a roller coaster in Phantasialand in Germany
 Black Mamba, a UK brand name for a synthetic cannabinoid
 Black Mamba, a nickname for the roadster bicycle in parts of East Africa
 Black Mamba, a flavor of Venom Energy